During the 1993–94 English football season, Notts County F.C. competed in Division One. They finished seventh in the league this season, just missing out on a place in the playoffs and the chance of Premier League football, and were runners-up in the Anglo-Italian Cup.

Season summary
In the 1993–94 season, Notts County narrowly missed the play-offs for promotion to the Premiership. The season is most remembered for a 2–1 victory over arch rivals Nottingham Forest in which Charlie Palmer scored the winning goal with just four minutes remaining. This has become a celebrated event among Notts County fans, who have dubbed 12 February (the anniversary of the game) Sir Charlie Palmer Day. In March 1994, the Magpies lost the Anglo-Italian Cup final to Brescia.

Final league table

Results
Notts County's score comes first

Legend

Football League First Division

FA Cup

League Cup

Anglo-Italian Cup

Squad

Left the club during season

References

Notts County F.C. seasons
Notts County